The Compass card is a contactless smart card automated fare collection system used primarily for public transit in Metro Vancouver, British Columbia, Canada. Compass card readers were first implemented as a beta in September 2013. Due to delays, full implementation to the general public began in August 2015. The system is operated by Cubic Transportation Systems and is managed by TransLink, the transportation authority for the region.

Compass cards and tickets have been required for all trips taken by SkyTrain, SeaBus, and West Coast Express since April 8, 2016. By June 2016, TransLink reported that more than 915,000 customers had switched to using Compass, which included 95% of customers who could have used other fare media such as cash or paper-based FareSaver tickets.

Riders are able to purchase Compass cards and add fare value online, by phone, or at Compass vending machines located at SeaBus terminals, SkyTrain stations, and West Coast Express stations. Compass vending machines are also available at 18 participating London Drugs retail store locations.

Overview

Users start by obtaining a Compass card from one of the vending machines located at SkyTrain, SeaBus, or West Coast Express stations, then add value to the card online, by phone, or directly at the vending machines. In late October 2015, cards became available from Compass vending machines at London Drugs stores. A card can be purchased at the customer service counter in any of these stores. Compass cards are also available for purchase wherever previous forms of transit fare media were available.

The current stored value for a card is available by submitting the Compass card number at the Compass website. These pages are not adapted to mobile device access and are not linked from the TransLink website. The Compass card number is not machine readable and must be submitted manually. If the user logs in, a history of usage and stored value can be viewed.

Once users obtain a Compass card with an adequate pass or an amount of stored value, they can tap in to enter a bus or transit station and tap out as they leave (except for buses). Tapping involves lightly touching the Compass card flat against a card reader.

Depending on the type of transit mode and vehicle the tap process differs slightly:

 Bus: riders tap card readers located at each bus door. Users are not required to tap out on a bus.
 SkyTrain and SeaBus: riders tap fare gates located at each entry and exit point of the station.
 West Coast Express: riders tap a free-standing validation machine located at each entry and exit point of the station.

When a rider starts their trip by tapping in at SkyTrain or SeaBus, the system will automatically reserve enough fare for three zones. Tapping out at the end of a trip will ensure that riders are only charged the fare for the distance (in zones) travelled. Failing to tap out at the end of the trip may result in a rider being charged a full three-zone fare even if only travelling one or two zones. If the trip is started from a bus, the system will only deduct fare for one-zone.

As riders transfer between transit modes or vehicles, such as when exiting a bus and entering a SkyTrain station, they must tap out and then tap back in. The system will automatically track transfers, ensuring riders are only charged once provided they are within the 90-minute transfer period (180 minutes for West Coast Express) and within the same transit zone.

TransLink estimated that 80,000 users were using the system by the end of January 2014. As of June 2016, Compass cards had been tapped on the system more than 371million times, at a rate of more than 1.5million every weekday. TransLink recorded a ridership increase of 1.8 percent and 3.2 percent in increased fare revenues in 2015, according to its 2015 annual report.

Fares 

Transit riders will have the option of paying for fares by Compass card or cash, but the Compass card offers lower fares. A rider who makes a cash payment at a Compass vending machine receives a paper-based Compass Ticket which is good for transfers within the 90-minute transfer period (180 minutes for West Coast Express).

Nearly half of TransLink's revenues come from fares. TransLink uses a three-zone fare system in the region for SkyTrain, Canada Line, West Coast Express and SeaBus service, with single adult fares ranging from $2.85 to $5.60 on weekdays. All fares on buses across the region are set at the one zone rate of $2.85, a switch TransLink made during the roll out of the Compass contactless smart card payment system.

Users purchase a Compass card for a $6 refundable deposit, then load it with stored value. The $6 deposit can be used temporarily if a rider forgets to maintain enough stored value, but the value on the card must be replenished above $6 before the next trip or they will not be able to tap in.

There are ten varieties of cards:
 Light blue – Adult
 Orange – Concession (children and seniors)
 White – CNIB
 Yellow – Contractors
 Dark blue (with photo) – TransLink employees
 Magenta red – personalized program passes such as:
 BC Bus Pass Program clients (low-income seniors and individuals receiving disability assistance from the Province of British Columbia)
 Access Transit/HandyDART card
 Burkeville residents (exempt from the YVR AddFare for SkyTrain stations on Sea Island)
 Green – 2016 limited edition, commemorating the opening of the Evergreen Extension. 
 White with Canada 150 emblem – 2017 limited edition, commemorating the 150th anniversary of Canada. 
 Dark blue with poppy illustration – 2018 Remembrance Day limited edition adult card honouring Canadian veterans and commemorating the 100th anniversary of the end of World War I
 Photo of poppy field at sunset – 2018 Remembrance Day limited edition concession card honouring Canadian veterans and commemorating the 100th anniversary of the end of World War I
 A vertically designed card with the quote "Be Kind, Be Calm, Be Safe", an often-recited mantra of provincial health officer Bonnie Henry during the COVID-19 pandemic in British Columbia.

The paper-based Compass tickets are grey in colour with blue text (Adult) or orange text (Concession). Because of the smartcard circuitry laminate between the paper, they are not recyclable.

TransLink released Compass wristbands in 2018 that function identically to Compass cards. TransLink also released Compass Minis in late 2019, which include a smaller version of the regular Compass card on a keychain.

Stored value 

The following tables illustrates single trip fares during peak and off-peak hours for bus, SeaBus, and SkyTrain riders.

Users must maintain a minimum of $0.01 value on the card to tap into buses, SkyTrain, or SeaBus, and a minimum of $4.50 to tap into West Coast Express.

Other passes 
DayPasses, U-Passes, and one-, two-, or three-zone monthly passes can be loaded directly onto the Compass card, with the option to renew automatically every month. Users who register online benefit from the auto renewal and balance protection, which protects the stored value in the event of card loss or theft. Passes are used prior to Stored Value being used.

History
SkyTrain and SeaBus were barrier-free at their inception. BC Transit, and later TransLink, took the position that the barrier-free proof of payment system was more effective than having fare gates or turnstiles. In the early 2000s, they estimated a five percent fare evasion rate on SkyTrain, or approximately $2million or less per year. Fare checks and fines issued inside Fare Paid Zones kept the rates at that level. Since the staff conducting the checks – SkyTrain attendants and transit police – would still be required even with physical fare barriers, maintaining a barrier fare system would be more costly than the barrier-free option.

In late 2007, the provincial Minister of Transportation, Kevin Falcon, announced interest in the installation of an access-controlled fare system.

In March 2008, Ken Dobell, a lobbyist for Cubic Corporation, started talks with Minister Falcon with the intention of selling technology to TransLink. Dobell, B.C. Premier Gordon Campbell's former deputy minister, had just been found guilty of breaching the Lobbyists Registration Act.

In April 2009, the Office of the Premier, the Government of Canada, and TransLink announced the implementation of fare gates and smart cards. The $194-million system was rolled out in November 2015; TransLink estimates it saves $2million a year in fare evasion.

In August 2022, TransLink announced they were working on allowing of Compass cards to be stored in digital wallets; however, they noted the feature could take years to implement.

Compass wristbands
TransLink rolled out Compass wristbands on December 3, 2018. These wristbands function the same as Compass cards. Initially 1000 blue adult wristbands and 1000 orange concession wristbands were made available to the public; they sold out in two hours. A batch of 10,000 wristbands arrived in February 2019.

Compass Mini
TransLink unveiled the Compass Mini in December 2019, a smaller version of the Compass card that fits on a keyring. There were 5000 adult Mini cards and 2500 concession Mini cards available when they were first released.

Compass Mini-Train
TransLink released the Compass Mini-Train in December 2022, which is shaped as a small train model and lights up when tapped. 3000 adult and 2000 concession passes were released.

Issues and controversies

Accessibility
Even on buses, users with physical handicaps may have difficulty tapping their card; this is even more apparent when they are faced with fare gates, which can completely prevent their access (bus drivers can waive the fare should they choose). The temporary solution was either having transit staff on hand to assist riders with difficulties, or keeping at least one fare gate per station open when staff was not present, but TransLink closed all fare gates on July 25, 2016, and required those with disabilities which prevent them from using fare gates to contact TransLink personnel for assistance. In January 2018, TransLink launched its Universal Fare Gate Access Program. Participants in the program are provided an RFID card that automatically opens the fare gate when the card comes in range and closes the gate once the customer passes through.

Transfers from buses 
Bus drivers are still required to issue paper transfers for cash fares, which are incompatible with the Compass system, requiring passengers to purchase additional Compass Tickets in order to transfer to SkyTrain or SeaBus. TransLink claimed it would cost an additional $25million to provide fare box upgrades on buses enabling them to dispense and accept Compass Tickets.

In the original full tap-in/tap-out design, a multi-zone bus trip could be completed for a single zone fare by tapping out within the first zone of travel but remaining on the bus. This fault was not publicly acknowledged by the administration until system testing in September 2013. Regardless of the loophole, Transit police or designated transit security fare enforcement officers may issue a $173 fine if they catch riders without adequate fare in a Fare Paid Zone. Furthermore, the tapping out process on buses was reported to be slow, and failure to record a passenger's tapping out may have resulted in the passenger being charged for travelling through three zones when in fact they only travelled through one or two zones.

On October 5, 2015, all bus travel throughout TransLink's system became 1-zone travel and bus passengers are neither required nor expected to tap out.

Delay in deployment and cost overrun

Despite a planned roll out in 2013, the full implementation of the system continues to be delayed by ongoing problems related to the bus tapping; this has been a serious setback for TransLink as the entire system had been supposed to be operational by 2013. The time frame announcement was pushed to late 2014, before TransLink changed its Compass Timeline website in late 2014 to remove statements promising a full Compass roll-out in late 2014, only stating that post-secondary students will receive cards in the summer of 2015, replacing the U-Pass BC, with full deployment not re-announced until September 2015.

In addition, TransLink confirmed in October 2013 that the cost overrun for the Compass card system had reached $23million due to delay related inflation and unanticipated scope creep. The Compass card system had been budgeted at $171million, but had risen to $194million.

References

External links
 Official Compass website

TransLink (British Columbia)
Contactless smart cards
Fare collection systems in Canada